Robert Ross Munro, OBE, OC  (September 6, 1913 - June 21, 1990) was the Canadian Press's lead war correspondent in Europe in World War II. He covered a Canadian raid in Spitsbergen, the 1942 raid on Dieppe, the Allied landings in Sicily, the Italian campaign, D-Day and the campaign in Northwestern Europe. His memoirs of the campaigns, published as From Gauntlet to Overlord, won the Governor General's Award for English-language non-fiction in 1945. He later covered the Korean War, and after retiring as a war correspondent became publisher of the Vancouver Daily Province, the Winnipeg Tribune, and the Edmonton Journal. Munro was appointed OBE in 1946 and OC in 1975.

Legacy
The Ross Munro Media Awards for Canadian military writing have been presented each year since 2002 by the Conference of Defence Associations, in concert with the Canadian Defence & Foreign Affairs Institute as an award for providing exceptional media coverage of Canadian defence and security issues. The "MUNRO AWARD" (2002) by André Gauthier is a statuette of Munro commissioned by the Conference of Defence Associations.

References

1913 births
1990 deaths
Canadian war correspondents
Canadian Officers of the Order of the British Empire
Officers of the Order of Canada
Canadian memoirists
Governor General's Award-winning non-fiction writers
20th-century memoirists